This is a list of notable fish dishes. In culinary and fishery contexts, fish includes shellfish, such as molluscs, crustaceans and echinoderms. Fish has been an important source of protein for humans throughout recorded history.

Fish dishes

Alphabetical list

A

B

C

D

E

F

G

H

I

J

K

L

M

N

O

P

Q

R

S

T

U

V

W

Y

List by ingredient

Raw fish dishes

Salmon dishes

Tuna dishes

Gallery

See also

 List of beef dishes
 List of chicken dishes
 List of fish sauces
 List of lamb dishes
 List of meatball dishes
 List of pork dishes
 List of seafood companies
 List of seafood dishes
 List of seafood restaurants
 Seafood dishes
 List of tuna dishes

References

External links
 
 
 

 
Fish dishes

Fish dishes